As Trees Walking is the 2002 debut studio solo album by Mitch Dorge. It won the Prairie Music Award for Outstanding Instrumental Recording.

Track listing
As Trees Walking
Cry
Ketamine
A Darker Side of Life
I’ll Always Love You
I’ll Always Love You (Original Version)

Personnel
 Mitch Dorge - keyboards, piano, percussion, programming

References

As Trees Walking